Subhash Mukhopadhyay (12 February 1919 – 8 July 2003) was one of the foremost Indian Bengali poets of the 20th century. He is also known as the "podatik kobi" ("foot-soldier poet") in the field of Bengali literature. A book of thirty of Subhash's best known poems in English translation, titled ' As Day is Breaking', was published in 2014 by Anjan Basu, a Bangalore-based writer/critic. The book includes a rather detailed introduction to the poet's work as well. He was honoured with Jnanpith Award in 1991.

Early life
Mukhopadhyay was born in 1919 in Krishnanagar, a town in Nadia district in the province of West Bengal. An excellent student, he studied philosophy at the Scottish Church College in Calcutta, graduating with honours  in 1941.

Career
Like his contemporary Sukanta Bhattacharya, Mukhopadhyay developed strong political beliefs at an early age. He was deeply committed to the cause of social justice, and was active in left-wing student politics through his college years. Following graduation, he formally joined the Communist Party of India. He thus became one of a handful of literary practitioners with first-hand experience as a party worker and activist.

In 1940, while still a student, he published his first volume of poetry Padatik (Pedestrian).  Many critics regard this book as a milestone in the development of modern Bengali poetry. It represented a clear departure from the earlier Kallol generation of poets; and Subhash's distinctive, direct voice, allied with his technical skill and radical world-view, gained him great popularity. In his poetry, Subhash grappled with the massive upheavals of that era which ruptured Bengali society from top to bottom. The 1940s were marked by world war, famine, partition, communal riots and mass emigration in Bengal. Subhash's writings broke away from the traditional moorings of the establishment poets, and instead addressed the despair and disillusion felt by the common people. He remained throughout his life an advocate of the indivisibility of the Bengali people and Bengali culture. His radical activism continued unabated. He was one of the leaders of the "Anti-Fascist Writers' and Artists' Association", formed in March 1942 in reaction to the murder of Somen Chanda, a fellow-writer and Marxist activist. Subhash remained attached with the Communist Party until 1982, and spent time in jail as a political prisoner briefly in the late 1960s. From the late 1950s onwards, Subhash's poetry evolved into something more personal and introspective. The lyricism of Phul phutuk na phutuk, aaj Boshonto, one of his most famous poems, was a result of this period.

Later in the 1970s, Subhash's poetry took a turn toward the narrative and the allegorical. But he never lost his technical facility nor his unique voice. Besides verse, Subhash also wrote works of prose including novels, essays and travelogues. He was active in journalism too, having served on the editorial staff of daily and weekly newspapers. He was an editor of the leading Bengali literary journal Parichay. He was also an accomplished and popular writer for children. He edited the Bengali children's periodical Sandesh jointly with Satyajit Ray for a few years in the early sixties.

Besides the above, Subhash's work as a translator is notable. He is credited with having translated many of Nazim Hizmet's works into Bengali (from Turkish).

Personal life

Mukhopadhyay married Gita Bandyopadhyay, also a well-known writer, in 1951. They adopted three daughters and a son.

According to those close to him, Mukhopadhyay had become disillusioned with politics in his final years. He suffered from severe heart and kidney ailments, and died in Kolkata in July 2003. He was 84.

Awards
Mukhopadhyay received numerous awards and honours in his lifetime, including the two highest literary prizes in India: the Sahitya Akademi Award in 1964 (for Joto Dureii Jai), and the Jnanpith Award in 1991. The Government of India awarded the civilian honour of the Padma Bhushan in 2003.

Bibliography

Sample work
Excerpt from Phul phutuk na phutuk, aaj Boshonto

Translation to English:

English translation of the poem Jol Saite

Notable works

 Padatik (The Foot Soldier)
 Chirkut  (The Parchment)
 Agnikone
 Phul Phutuk (Let the Flowers Bloom)
 Joto Dureii Jai  (How Distant I may be)
 E Bhai (Hey, Brother)
 Kaal Modhumash (Tomorrow is Spring)
 Cheley Gechhey Boney (The Son has gone to Exile)
 Bangalir Itihaash  (History of Bengalis)
 Desh Bidesher Rupkotha (Fairy Tales from Home and Abroad)

Recognition

 Sahitya Akademi Award, 1964
 Afro-Asian Lotus Prize, 1977
 Kumaran Asan Award, 1982
 Mirzo Tursunzoda Prize (USSR), 1982
 Ananda Puraskar, 1991
 Soviet Land Nehru Award
 Jnanpith Award, 1991.

He was a fellow of the Sahitya Akademi, and was the Deputy Secretary of the Progressive Writers' Union. He was conferred Deshikottama (Honorary D.Litt.) by the Visva-Bharati University, Santiniketan. He was the Organizer-General of the Afro-Asian Writers' Association in 1983. He was also a member of the Executive Board of the Sahitya Akademi since 1987.

The U.S. Library of Congress has a collection of forty titles by him including translations.

Legacy
 In 2010 a metro railways station in Kolkata Kavi Subhash Metro Station has been named after poet.
In 2009 Sealdah-NJP Express was named "Padatik Express" after this book in memory of the poet.

References

External links

 The poet recites from his own poems for the Library of Congress Literary Recordings Project
 BBC obituary dated 8 July 2003
 Subhash Mukhopadhyay (1919-2003)

1919 births
2003 deaths
20th-century Bengali poets
Indian male poets
Writers from Kolkata
Scottish Church College alumni
University of Calcutta alumni
Recipients of the Ananda Purashkar
Recipients of the Jnanpith Award
Recipients of the Sahitya Akademi Award in Bengali
Indian Marxist poets
Indian Communist poets
People from Krishnagar
20th-century Indian poets
Recipients of the Padma Bhushan in literature & education
Bengali male poets
Poets from West Bengal